Postes, télégraphes et téléphones may refer to:
Postes, télégraphes et téléphones (France)
Postes, télégraphes, téléphones (Switzerland)